Someone You Love is a 2014 Danish drama film directed by Pernille Fischer Christensen.

Cast 
 Mikael Persbrandt - Thomas Jacob
 Trine Dyrholm - Molly Moe
 Birgitte Hjort Sørensen - Julie
 Sofus Rønnov - Noa
 Eve Best - Kate
 Lourdes Faberes - Pepita Ponce

References

External links 

2014 drama films
Danish drama films